CarneyVale: Showtime is a vertical platformer developed by Singapore-MIT GAMBIT Game Lab and published by Microsoft Game Studios. It was initially released on Xbox Live Indie Games (then Xbox Live Community Games) on Xbox 360. Players play as Slinky, "a circus acrobat trying to rise up the ranks by performing acrobatic tricks and death-defying stunts through increasingly complex arenas".

The game won the 2008 Dream-Build-Play Challenge, was declared a finalist in the 2008 Independent Games Festival, and was featured as one of the PAX 10 top games at the 2009 Penny Arcade Expo.

Ports and re-releases 
Microsoft Game Studios published ports of the game for Windows Phone 7 and Microsoft Windows, which were released on October 18, 2010 and November 1, 2010; respectively. The Windows port was released exclusively via the Games for Windows Marketplace with Games for Windows – Live support.

The rights to the game were bought by Appxplore, who ported it to Android and iOS on May 5, 2016.

Footnotes

Notes

References

External links 
CarneyVale: Showtime at the Singapore-MIT GAMBIT Game Lab
CarneyVale: Showtime at Appxplore

2008 video games
Android (operating system) games
Games for Windows certified games
Indie video games
IOS games
Massachusetts Institute of Technology software
Microsoft games
Platform games
Side-scrolling video games
Single-player video games
Video games developed in Singapore
Video games developed in the United States
Video games with user-generated gameplay content
Windows games
Windows Phone games
Xbox 360 Live Indie games